Self-realization is a self-awakening.

Self-realization may also refer to:
 Self-Realization Fellowship, worldwide spiritual organization founded by Paramahansa Yogananda
 Atman jnana, the Hindu concept of self-knowledge as the self realizing it is identical with Brahman
 God-realization (Meher Baba), a state of self-realization described by Meher Baba
 Psychosynthesis, an original approach to psychology that was developed by Roberto Assagioli
 Liberation from samsara, the cycle of death and rebirth (reincarnation), called Moksha in Hinduism

See also
Self-actualization
Enlightenment (spiritual)
Mysticism
Nondualism
Simran